Nie Shubin (November 6, 1974 – April 27, 1995) was a Chinese man wrongfully executed for a rape and murder in the Hebei suburb of Shijiazhuang. His is one of the most famous wrongful executions in the history of the People's Republic of China, and considered an example of the injustice in the Communist Chinese legal system from the "Strike Hard" era.

Trial and execution 
In 1994, police in Shijiazhuang found the decomposed corpse of Kang Juhua, a woman in her thirties, in a cornfield between the Shijiazhuang Hydraulic Parts Factory and Kongzhai Village. Near the corpse police found a bicycle, a dress and underwear. After a brief on-the-spot investigation, the police determined that this was a road rape and murder case. 20 year old Nie Shubin was one of the first bicyclists to pass by the area after police discovered the scene. He was arrested on the spot.

In an extremely short surprise trial characteristic of the "Strike Hard" campaigns of the era, Nie was charged on April 20, 1995, arraigned on the 22nd, convicted on the 25th, issued a death warrant on the 26th, and executed by shooting on the 27th. On the 28th, Nie's father went to the detention center to deliver daily necessities for his son as usual, when the staff told him, "don't come again, your son was executed yesterday."

At the time, an official in the Hebei procuratorate raised an objection, believing that beyond the (likely forced) confession, there was no other evidence of Nie's guilt, and demanded that the sentence be changed. Reportedly it was Xu Yongyue as secretary of the Hebei Political and Legal Committee, who ordered security officials to "kill him, and kill him quickly."

Exoneration and new suspect 
In 2005, convicted murderer Wang Shujin confessed to the police that he had committed the murder, and a team of investigators from the Hebei Province High People's Court began to review Nie's conviction. Xu Yongyue, by then Minister of State Security, reportedly came forward and made great efforts to obstruct the investigation, leaning on former colleagues in Hebei and other senior MSS officials. Hebei provincial authorities attempted to strongarm Wang Shujin to revise his confession, including under threat of torture.

In 2015, the Hebei Province High People's Court, which upheld Nie’s murder conviction in 1995 (clearing the way for his execution), expressed "sincere apologies" to his parents on Weibo, and vacated his criminal conviction. The parents were awarded ¥ ($396,520 USD) by the Chinese government in 2017 after the Supreme People's Court announced Nie's innocence in December 2016.

On February 2, 2021, Wang was executed.

Legacy 
Nie Shubin's case reportedly influenced the Chinese government to introduce requirements mandating all police interrogations be video recorded.

References 

Wrongful executions
People executed by China by firing squad
People from Shijiazhuang

Executed Chinese people
People executed by China